The 1957 Liga Española de Baloncesto season was the first season of the Liga Española de Baloncesto. The season ended with Real Madrid winning their first championship.

Teams

The league was composed by 6 teams and played with a double round-robin format. The league was played in 50 days (March 31–May 19) at only two venues: Fiesta Alegre in Madrid and Palacio de los Deportes in Barcelona.

Venues and locations

League table

Results
<div style="overflow:auto">

Individual statistics

Points

References

External links
ACB.com 
60th anniversary dossier at FEB.es 
linguasport 

Liga Española de Baloncesto (1957–1983) seasons
Spain
1956–57 in Spanish basketball